John Shirley (born 1953) is an American writer.

John or Jon Shirley may also refer to:
John Shirley (footballer) (1902–?), footballer
John Shirley (sailor) (born 1958), British Virgin Islands sailor
John Shirley (scribe) (died 1456)
John Shirley (died 1616), English politician
Jon Shirley (born 1938), president of Microsoft

See also
John Shurley (disambiguation)